Maria Patra (born 17 October 1998) is a Greek water polo player for NC Vouliagmeni and the Greece women's national water polo team.

She participated at the 2018 Women's European Water Polo Championship. She won the silver medal at the 2022 Women's European Water Polo Championship.

Personal
His father Vangelis is a former waterpolo goalkeeper.

References

1998 births
Living people
Greek female water polo players
Water polo players at the 2015 European Games
European Games medalists in water polo
European Games bronze medalists for Greece
21st-century Greek women